Louise Anne Marie Després (19 September 1874 in Vervins – 21 August 1906 in Paris) was a French croquet player. She competed at the 1900 Summer Olympics and came fifth in both her events; the one ball singles and the two ball singles.

References

External links

1874 births
1906 deaths
Olympic croquet players of France
French croquet players
Croquet players at the 1900 Summer Olympics
Sportspeople from Aisne